The Challenge, released as It Takes a Thief in the United States,  is a 1960 British neo noir crime film directed by John Gilling and starring Jayne Mansfield and Anthony Quayle.

The film was shot in England from 12 October to around December 1959. Mansfield flew back to America on the 16th, after she finished filming.

Plot
Mansfield plays Billy, the ruthless gang leader who persuades Maxton to take part in a big robbery. Maxton  is shopped and  convicted of robbery. Maxton serves his time, returns home to his son. The gang want the money which he buried but Maxton wants nothing more to do with it or them. The gang then kidnap Maxton's son and demand the  money as ransom. There follows a race against time to save Maxton's son. At the end of the film, a policeman tells Maxton that the stolen money had been found three years previously.

Cast
Jayne Mansfield	... 	Billy
Anthony Quayle	... 	Jim
Carl Möhner	... 	Kristy
Peter Reynolds	... 	Buddy
Barbara Mullen	... 	Ma Piper
Robert Brown	... 	Bob Crowther
Dermot Walsh	... 	Detective Sergeant Willis
Patrick Holt       ... 	Max
Edward Judd	... 	Detective Sergeant Gittens
John Bennett	... 	Spider
Lorraine Clewes	... 	Mrs. Rick
Percy Herbert	... 	Shop Steward
John Stratton	... 	Rick
Liane Marelli	... 	Striptease Artiste
Bill McGuffie	... 	Nightclub Pianist
Peter Pike ... Joey

Critical reception
TV Guide wrote, "most of the actors, with the exception of Quayle, are pretty stiff, and the story is hardly inspired."
Sky Movies noted, "filled with such familiar leading men of British 'B' features as Peter Reynolds, Edward Judd, Dermot Walsh and Patrick Holt. Some of the best moments, though, are provided by Hollywood's Jayne Mansfield as the criminal mastermind, demure in black wig and horn-rimmed glasses as she does her 'firm's' books by day, but slinking around in sequins by night with a smile and a song."

External links

Review of Renown Pictures DVD release

References

1960 films
British neo-noir films
1960 crime films
Films directed by John Gilling
British crime films
1960s English-language films
1960s British films